Daniel Everett "Dan" Wathen (born November 4, 1939 in Easton, Maine) is a Maine lawyer and politician. He was Chief Justice of the Maine Supreme Judicial Court from March 1992 until October 2001, when he resigned to run for Governor of Maine as a Republican. At the time of his announcement, many pollsters and academics did not believe Wathen would factor into the 2002 gubernatorial election. He was replaced as Chief Justice by Leigh Saufley.

Wathen is a native of Easton in Aroostook County, Maine. He graduated from Ricker College in Houlton and earned his law degree from the University of Maine School of Law. He also holds a Master of Laws degree from the University of Virginia School of Law.

As of 2010, Wathen oversaw court-ordered improvements in mental health services. Wathen testified before the Health and Human Services committee of the Maine legislature that cuts to mental health services would be "illusory" and the proposed cuts would be spent elsewhere, such as in prison services for mentally ill people. Attorney General Janet Mills defended Governor John Baldacci's plan to cut mental health services.

As of 2011, Wathen was the Board Chairman of the Maine Turnpike Authority.

Since 2002, he has served as Of Counsel for Pierce Atwood LLP, a law firm which has an office based in Augusta, Maine.

In April of 2013, Governor Paul R. LePage nominated him to serve as Co-Chair of the Maine Unemployment Investigation Commission.

References

1939 births
Living people
People from Aroostook County, Maine
Maine lawyers
Ricker College alumni
University of Maine School of Law alumni
Chief Justices of the Maine Supreme Judicial Court
Justices of the Maine Supreme Judicial Court
University of Virginia School of Law alumni